Anton Ratasepp (1881 – ?) was an Estonian politician. He was a member of Estonian Constituent Assembly. He was a member of the assembly since 9 August 1919. He replaced August Tibar.

References

1881 births
Members of the Estonian Constituent Assembly
Year of death missing